The Golden Eagle Festival, or simply Eagle Festival, is an annual neo-traditional

festival held in Bayan-Ölgii aimag, Mongolia. In the eagle festival, Kazakh eagle hunters (Burkitshi) celebrate their heritage and compete in lure-based and timed eagle handling events with specially trained golden eagles, showing off the skills both of the birds and their trainers (said skills may not necessarily translate to actual hunting prowess: See explanatory information below in paragraph starting with the words "Despite the above-noted descriptions"
). Prizes are awarded for speed, agility and accuracy, as well as for the best traditional Kazakh dress, and more.

The Eagle Festival is held during the first weekend in October, run by the Mongolian Eagle Hunter's Association. Dark, rocky mountainous terrain forms the backdrop to the festivities, which incorporate an opening ceremony, parade, cultural exhibitions, demonstrations and handcrafts in the centre of the town of Ölgii, followed by sporting activities and competitions  outside of town towards the mountains. Dressed in full eagle hunting regalia and mounted on groomed decorated horses, the entrants compete for the awards of Best Turned Out Eagle and Owner; Best Eagle at Hunting Prey and Best Eagle at Locating Its Owner from a Distance. Other sporting activities include horse racing, archery and the highly entertaining Bushkashi - goatskin tug of war on horseback.

The Eagle Festival is featured in the 2016 documentary The Eagle Huntress, in which the 13-year-old Kazakh girl Aisholpan becomes the first female to enter and win the competition. 
In the References/Criticism section of the film's Wikipedia description, Aisholpan's journey was originally promoted as her having to "battle an ingrained culture of misogyny to become the first female Eagle Hunter in 2,000 years of male-dominated history". This false marketing existed for 7 months until replaced with the description that currently exists which no longer makes the false claim that Aisholpan was the first female in her Kazakh culture/history.[6] Aisholpan continues to be promoted as having been victorious over "all the best" eagle hunters in the Western Mongolia in winning the 2014 Golden Eagle Festival as featured in the film (ie. by film production company Sony Pictures Classic in their Student Study Guide for the film). The Golden Eagle Festival is widely recognized as having been popularized via the film and tour companies also widely refer to The Eagle Huntress film in their promotions.

A smaller festival, the Sagsai Golden Eagle Festival on 17-18 September each year especially for photographers, cinematographers and photo journalists, and the Altai Kazakh Eagle Festival, is also held each year in the nearby village of Sagsai in the last week of September. It follows much the same pattern as the larger Golden Eagle Festival, with about 40 eagle hunters participating.

Despite the above-noted descriptions and the popularization of the Golden Eagle Festival via The Eagle Huntress documentary by Otto Bell, there exist starkly underpublicized facts about the Festival's cultural positionality in terms of authenticity and (eagle) animal welfare. This is elucidated by Dr. Lauren Mueller McGough, an anthropologist and expert eagle falconer who mentored under traditional eagle falconers in Western Mongolia. From Chapter 1 section called 'The Bigger Picture' of Dr. McGough's PhD thesis called "Partnerships and understanding between Kazakh Pastorialists and golden eagles of the Altai Mountains of the Altai Mountains:A Multi-Species Ethnography": "Hunting with eagles changes quite profoundly the further you travel from Olgii city. The key to understanding this is tourism. In the 1990s, Mongolia devoted a lot of funding and resources to encouraging tourism and creating a navigable tourist infrastructure. It has been very successful, and outside mining, tourism now represents the primary source of GDP for the country. In 1999, the Golden Eagle Festival was founded in Olgii City in order to encourage tourism to Bayan-Olgii. The Festival takes place In October, and consists of three events over two days in which a panel of judges scores a berkutchi and his eagle. [describes the lure-based eagle hunting events etc.] Since actual hunting takes place in deep winter and is very physically demanding, many tourists are not able to experience it. The Festival is a substitute. However, the eagles that will excel at the Festival are very different from eagles that will excel at catching foxes in remote areas. In the next chapter, I will write about how sub-adult eagles are trapped and socialized with humans. These eagles, fiercely independent creatures, are ideal hunting partners. However, they aren’t so tolerant of new situations or crowds of people. At the Festival, which has become very popular in recent years (hosting several hundred tourists), wild-trapped sub-adult eagles will not tolerate flying near huge crowds. They’ll fly away instead, back to the safety of the remote, sparsely inhabited stretches of the Altai. In order to have eagles to fly at the Festival, some Kazakhs have taken to using colberkuts or ‘hand-eagles’. These are eagles where are taken from the nest as downy chicks, or eyasses to use the falconry term, at mere days of age. These eagles become imprinted on humans, and know nothing other than life with humans. Thus, they are impossible to lose and have no fear of the largest thronging crowd. They will fly to the glove and the fox pelt at the Festival without issue. However, these eagles, deprived of the learning experience with their parents, don’t know how to hunt. As any fox-catching eaglehunter will tell you, humans can only do a poor job of teaching an eagle how to hunt. The utility of trapping a sub-adult eagle, is it already knows how to catch foxes, you merely have to convince the eagle that you are an ally in that pursuit. What I then found, is that the closer I was to Olgii city, the more colberkuts I saw. These hand-raised eagles gives themselves away by continually begging for food (these eagles are too mentally stunted to reach adolescence, and can never be released). The food call is a loud “psh-ack psh-ack psh-ack” sound. They also fly weakly and have no level of fitness. As useless as colberkuts are for hunting, they are great for tourism. Tourists don’t know the difference. A large portion of the 300 berkutchi mentioned are Kazakhs who keep these colberkuts purely to take to the Festival and to show to tourists. One can hardly blame them, as to be able to invite tourists into your home can represent a lot of income for a family that typically relies on volatile cashmere and meat prices. However, this recent phenomenon of the Festival and colberkuts is not within the scope of this thesis. This thesis is focused on eagle culture and the tradition of hunting with eagles as it relates to the practical catching of foxes. That is, the millennia sustained tradition of trapping sub-adult eagles, socializing them to hunt in partnership with humans, and then releasing them. This is the tradition from which the vast well of ethno-ornithological knowledge of the Kazakh people." [3]
Dr. McGough talks about this further in a Bird Calls Radio interview from the 14,25 time code: https://birdcallsradio.com/bcr-202-lauren-mcgough-falconer/

Dr. Joseph Recupero lends further insight in his study entitled, "The Price on Our Practices: Motivation and Cultural Commodification in the Mongolian Tourism Industry"(2015). Independent Study Project (ISP) Collection. 2203. https://digitalcollections.sit.edu/isp_collection/2203 (on pages 34-5): "International recognition and the process of cultural commodification among Kazakh eagle-hunters heavily involves the development and annual continuation of eagle-hunting festivals. As Iris, the eldest eagle-hunter I interviewed expressed, “it [eagle-hunting] is international, famous in the world. That’s why I think it’s a sport now, and the Kazakhs do the sport (Iris, 2015). While many eagle-hunters still hold eagle-hunting as a cultural practice, the nature of a sport is its ability to become internationally known, and therefore effected by globalizing processes. Prior to major tourist arrivals at eagle-hunting festivals, live animals were used as prey in the hunting competitions, but in the early 2000s, tourists began to complain of the cruelty of using trapped animals in sporting competitions. Because of these complaints and a need to keep tourists satisfied, live animals were replaced with pulled furs, which the eagles 
would track and capture (Shaimurat, 2015). Not only has the presence of tourists and the development of a festival economy altered the proceedings of eagle-hunting festivals, it has also began to alter perceptions among community members of how “real” eagle-hunting is defined. Jensibek, the youngest eagle-hunter whom I spoke with described his initial interests in eagle-hunting as a way to gain recognition and make money from a sporting competition (Jensibek, 2015). While he learned to eagle-hunt in a traditional manner, and does hunt outside of competition, his initial desire shows the changing of prioritization of a younger generation with more exposure to the tourism industry than their parents and grandparents. This changing of 
prioritization and desire for fame has led to the creation of “fake” eagle-hunters, as described by 
Sailaukhan; “Because there is sport games, people only want to compete year after year, and only hunt for the competitions” (Sailaukhan, 2015). In further discussion, it was clear to see that the younger generation, seeking fame and money, neglect to learn the cultural and traditional importance of eagle-hunting, and only learn the skills required to win competitions. The abilityof hunters to recognize what they consider as “fake” hunters shows a shift in perception of authenticity and what the “true” or “real” practice of eagle-hunting includes. Changing 
perceptions within a community show a realization that tourism is making changes to cultural traditions, and by commodifying practices, some cultural authenticity is being sacrificed in order to gain a profit. Beyond the two focus communities, as discussed in an interview with Oyunta, a festival 
organizer, tourism is having altering effects on larger aspects of Mongolian culture. As she explained, because families realize that money can be made off hosting tourists for a night, the aspects of hospitality are decreasing, as local peoples see tourists as more of an opportunity for profit and less of a friendly visitor. Meals, tea, and snacks begin to have price tags, and hospitality becomes more of a marketing practice than an authentic offering (Oyunta, 2015). Changes such as these often go unnoticed by the peoples on which they are occurring, and 
therefore are not viewed as changes at all, but simple capitalization on presented opportunitieswithin a cultural context. For this reason, it is important to have outside perspectives looking into the changes to a cultural or cultural practices brought about by tourism, so that an understanding can be achieved and possible solutions proposed for maintaining authenticity while also gaining profit." [5]

References
5. The Price on Our Practices: Motivation and Cultural Commodification in the Mongolian Tourism Industry"(2015). Independent Study Project (ISP) Collection. 2203. https://digitalcollections.sit.edu/isp_collection/2203 (on pages 34-5)

6. Wikipedia description for The Eagle Huntress documentary  https://en.m.wikipedia.org/wiki/The_Eagle_Huntress

Further reading 

 Recupero, Joseph, "The Price on Our Practices: Motivation and Cultural Commodification in the Mongolian Tourism Industry"(2015). Independent Study Project (ISP) Collection. 2203. https://digitalcollections.sit.edu/isp_collection/2203 (Pages 34-5)
 
 When the Hunt is Over: Culture and Conservation in Kazakh Eagle Falconry. Nolan R. Ebner, PhD. 2016

 Soma, Takuya. 2012. ‘Contemporary Falconry in Altai-Kazakh in Western Mongolia’The International Journal of Intangible Heritage (vol.7), pp. 103–111. 
 Soma, Takuya. 2012. ‘Ethnoarhchaeology of Horse-Riding Falconry’, The Asian Conference on the Social Sciences 2012 - Official Conference Proceedings, pp. 167–182. 
 Soma, Takuya. 2012. ‘Intangible Cultural Heritage of Arts and Knowledge for Coexisting with Golden Eagles: Ethnographic Studies in “Horseback Eagle-Hunting” of Altai-Kazakh Falconers’, The International Congress of Humanities and Social Sciences Research, pp. 307–316. 
 Soma, Takuya. 2012. ‘The Art of Horse-Riding Falconry by Altai-Kazakh Falconers’. In HERITAGE 2012 (vol.2) - Proceedings of the 3rd International Conference on Heritage and Sustainable Development, edited by Rogério Amoêda, Sérgio Lira, & Cristina Pinheiro, pp. 1499–1506. Porto: Green Line Institute for Sustainable Development. .
 Soma, Takuya. 2012. ‘Horse-Riding Falconry in Altai-Kazakh Nomadic Society: Anthropological Researches in Summertime Activities of Falconers and Golden Eagle’. Japanese Journal of Human and Animal Relation 32: pp. 38–47 (written in Japanese).  
 Soma, Takuya. 2013. ‘Ethnographic Study of Altaic Kazakh Falconers’, Falco: The Newsletter of the Middle East Falcon Research Group 41, pp. 10–14. 
 Soma, Takuya. 2013. ‘Ethnoarchaeology of Ancient Falconry in East Asia’, The Asian Conference on Cultural Studies 2013 - Official Conference Proceedings, pp. 81–95. 
 Soma, Takuya. 2013. ‘Hunting Arts of Eagle Falconers in the Altai-Kazakhs: Contemporary Operations of Horse-Riding Falconry in Sagsai County, Western Mongolia’. Japanese Journal of Human and Animal Relation 35:　pp. 58–66 (written in Japanese).
 Takuya Soma. 2014. Human and Raptor Interactions in the Context of a Nomadic Society: Anthropological and Ethno-Ornithological Studies of Altaic Kazakh Falconry and its Cultural Sustainability in Western Mongolia (PhD Thesis submitted to University of Kassel, 20 August 2014)
 相馬拓也 2012「アルタイ＝カザフ鷹匠による騎馬鷹狩猟: イヌワシと鷹匠の夏季生活誌についての基礎調査」『ヒトと動物の関係学会誌（vol. 32）』: pp. 38–47.
 相馬拓也 2013「アルタイ=カザフ鷹匠たちの狩猟誌: モンゴル西部サグサイ村における騎馬鷹狩猟の実践と技法の現在」『ヒトと動物の関係学会誌（vol.35）』: pp. 58–66.
 日本放送協会(NHK). 2003. 『地球に好奇心：大草原にイヌワシが舞う～モンゴル・カザフ族 鷹匠の親子～』: NHKエンタープライズ(co-produced by 群像舎), (on air: 10:05-10:57, 13 December 2003), NHK-BS2 Television. 
 日本放送協会(NHK). 2010. 『アジアンスマイル: 僕とイヌワシの冬物語～モンゴル・サグサイ村～』: NHKエンタープライズ(co-produced by 株式会社グループ現代), (on air: 18:30-18:50, 16 January 2010), NHK BS1 Television.
 日本放送協会(NHK). 2015. 『地球イチバン: 地球最古のイーグルハンター』: NHK文化福祉部制作, (on air: 22:00-22:50, 29 January 2015), NHK総合.

Dr. Lauren McGough's PhD thesis study entitled "Partnerships and understanding between Kazakh pastoralists and golden eagles of the Altai mountains : a multi-species ethnography" published on April 12, 2019 (University of St. Andrews)
Url: https://research-repository.st-andrews.ac.uk/handle/10023/18955

External links

Official website of Golden Eagle Festival organizers
Festivals in Mongolia
Falconry
Eagles
Autumn events in Mongolia

Golden Eagle Festival tour 2023